Steven Michael Quezada (born February 15, 1963) is an American actor and politician. He played Drug Enforcement Administration (DEA) agent Steven Gomez in the AMC series Breaking Bad from 2008 to 2013 and 2 episodes of its spin-off, Better Call Saul in 2020.

Early life and education
Quezada was born in Albuquerque, New Mexico. He graduated from West Mesa High School in 1981. After graduating from high school, Quezada attended Eastern New Mexico University where he studied theatre arts, but did not earn a degree.

Career
Quezada played Drug Enforcement Administration (DEA) Agent Steven Gomez in Breaking Bad from 2008 to 2013. He has appeared in films such as First Snow (2006), Beerfest (2006), and Kites (2010). He hosted the talk show The After After Party in Albuquerque from 2010 to 2012. Quezada portrays a priest presiding over a roadside funeral in country singer Eric Church's music video for the single Give Me Back My Hometown (2014).
He currently performs stand-up comedy for Carnival Cruise Line.

On February 4, 2013, he was elected to the Albuquerque school board; He ran unopposed for the District 2 seat on the city's west side. In 2016, Quezada ran for and won the Democratic nomination for New Mexico's Bernalillo County Board of Commissioners for District 2. In a three-way race, Quezada won with 36 percent of the vote. He defeated Republican Patricia Paiz in the general election and was sworn in for a four-year term. He was re-elected in 2020 with no general election opposition.

Electoral history

2016

2020

Filmography

Film

Television

Music videos

References

External links

 

1963 births
Living people
21st-century American male actors
Male actors from Albuquerque, New Mexico
American actor-politicians
American male actors of Mexican descent
American male film actors
American male television actors
Hispanic and Latino American male actors
Male actors from New Mexico
School board members in New Mexico
New Mexico Democrats
County commissioners in New Mexico
Hispanic and Latino American people in New Mexico politics